The following is a list of transcontinental canals and waterways, that is, canals or canal proposals, which allows waterway traffic to span across a continent or subcontinent.

List

See also
 List of interoceanic canals
 Lists of canals

References

Transcontinental
Ship canals
International canals